Lee-Marvin Mazibuko (born 12 October 1997) is a South African rugby union player for the  in the Currie Cup. His regular position is prop.

He made his debut in the same match, starting the game as a late replacement for Frans Malherbe.

References

South African rugby union players
Living people
1997 births
Rugby union props
Western Province (rugby union) players
Stormers players
Rugby Viadana players